The TV Parental Guidelines are a television content rating system in the United States that was first proposed on December 19, 1996, by the United States Congress, the television industry and the Federal Communications Commission (FCC), and went into effect by January 1, 1997, on most major broadcast and cable networks in response to public concerns about increasingly explicit sexual content, graphic violence and strong profanity in television programs. It was established as a voluntary-participation system, with ratings to be determined by the individual participating broadcast and cable networks.

The ratings are generally applied to most television series, television films and edited broadcast or basic cable versions of theatrically released films; premium channels also assign ratings from the TV Parental Guidelines on broadcasts of some films that have been released theatrically or on home video, either if the Motion Picture Association of America did not assign a rating for the film or if the channel airs an unrated version of a film.

The ratings were designed to be used with the V-chip, which was mandated to be built into all television sets manufactured since 2000 (and the vast majority of cable/satellite set-top boxes), but the guidelines themselves have no legal force, and are not used on sports or news programs or during commercial advertisements. Many online television services, such as Hulu, Amazon Video, and Netflix also use the guidelines system, along with digital video vendors such as the iTunes Store and Google Play and digital media players,  including the Amazon Fire TV, Apple TV, Android TV, and Roku platforms.

Development of the guidelines 
In the Telecommunications Act of 1996, the United States Congress called upon the entertainment industry to establish, within one year, a voluntary television rating system to provide parents with advance information on material in television programming that might be unsuitable for their children. This rating system would work in conjunction with the V-chip, a device embedded in television sets that enables parents to block programming they determine to be inappropriate.

On February 29, 1996, all segments of the entertainment industry, led by the National Association of Broadcasters (NAB), the National Cable & Telecommunications Association (NCTA), and the Motion Picture Association of America (MPAA), joined and voluntarily pledged to create such a system. They agreed that the guidelines would be applied by broadcast and cable networks in order to handle the large amount of programming that must be reviewed – some 2,000 hours a day. The guidelines would be applied episodically to all programming based on their content, except for news, sports and advertising.

The same year on December 19, the industry announced the creation of the TV Parental Guidelines, a voluntary system of guidelines providing parents with information to help them make more informed choices about the television programs their children watch. The guidelines were modeled after the movie ratings system created by the Motion Picture Association of America in 1968. The television industry agreed to insert a ratings icon on-screen at the beginning of all rated programs, and to encode the guidelines for use with the V-chip. The industry also created a Monitoring Board, composed of TV industry experts, to ensure accuracy, uniformity and consistency of the guidelines and to consider any public questions about the guideline applied to a particular program. The TV Parental Guidelines went into use on January 1, 1997.

In response to calls to provide additional content information in the ratings system, on August 1, 1997, the television industry, in conjunction with representatives of children's and medical advocacy groups, announced revisions to the rating system. Under this revised system, television programming would continue to fall into one of the six ratings categories (TV-Y, TV-Y7, TV-G, TV-PG, TV-14 or TV-MA), but content descriptors would be added to the ratings where appropriate, based on the type(s) of objectionable content included in the individual program or episode: D (suggestive dialogue), L (coarse language), S (sexual content), V (violence) and FV (fantasy violence – a descriptor exclusively for use in the TV-Y7 category).

Further, the proposal stated that the icons and associated content symbols would appear for 15 seconds at the beginning of all rated programming, and that the size of the icons would be increased. The revised guidelines were supported by leading family and child advocacy groups, as well as television broadcasters, cable systems and networks, and television production companies. Finally, the revised proposal called for five representatives of the advocacy community to be added to the TV Parental Guidelines Monitoring Board. On March 12, 1998, the Federal Communications Commission found that the Industry Video Programming Rating System was acceptable, and adopted technical requirements for the V-chip.

In June 2021, creators, writers, and directors of TV animation in a report for the website Insider said that one of the forms of pressure to have less overt depiction of LGBTQ+ characters or culture was the TV Parental Guidelines system, resulting in domestic and international content being cut out of episodes. One of the criticisms was that the rarely updated guidelines offer no guidance on LGBTQ+ representation and the ratings are only changed "in the face of complaints".

Ratings 

The direct description of each rating from the TV Parental Guidelines Monitoring Board is listed above the extended ratings description in italics.

TV-Y 

This program is designed to be appropriate for all children.
Designed to be appropriate for children of all ages. The thematic elements portrayed in programs with this rating are specifically designed for a very young audience.

TV-Y7 

This program is designed for children age 7 and above.
Designed for children age 7 and older. The FCC states that it "may be more appropriate for children who have acquired the developmental skills needed to distinguish between make-believe and reality". The thematic elements portrayed in programs with this rating contain mild fantasy and comedic violence.

Programs where fantasy violence may be more intense or more combative.
Programs given the "FV" content descriptor exhibit more 'fantasy violence' and are generally more intense or combative than other programs rated TV-Y7.

TV-G 

Most parents will find this program suitable for all ages.
Programs are generally suitable for all audiences, though they may not necessarily contain content of interest to children. The FCC states that "this rating does not signify a program designed specifically for children, [and] most parents may let younger children watch this program unattended". The thematic elements portrayed in programs with this rating contain little or no violence, mild language, and little or no sexual dialogue or situations.

TV-PG 

This program contains material that parents may find unsuitable for younger children.
Programs may contain some material that parents or guardians may find inappropriate for younger children. Programs assigned a TV-PG rating may include infrequent coarse language, some sexual content, some suggestive dialogue, or moderate violence.

TV-14 

This program contains material that most parents would find unsuitable for children under 14 years of age.
Programs contain material that parents or adult guardians may find unsuitable for children under the age of 14. The FCC warns that "parents are cautioned to exercise some care in monitoring this program and are cautioned against letting children under the age of 14 watch unattended". Programs with this rating contain intensely suggestive dialogue, strong coarse language, intense sexual situations or intense violence.

TV-MA 

This program is specifically designed to be viewed by adults and therefore may be unsuitable for children under 17. 
Contains content that may be unsuitable for children. This rating was originally TV-M prior to the announced revisions to the rating system in August 1997 but was changed due to a trademark dispute and in order to remove confusion with the Entertainment Software Rating Board's (ESRB) "M for Mature" rating for video games. This rating is rarely used by broadcast networks or local television stations due to FCC restrictions on program content, although it is commonly applied to television programs featured on certain cable channels (basic and premium networks) and streaming networks for both mainstream and softcore programs. Programs with this rating may include crude indecent language, explicit sexual activity and graphic violence.

Content descriptors 

Some thematic elements, according to the FCC, "may call for parental guidance and/or the program may contain one or more of the following" sub-ratings, designated with an alphabetic letter:
 D – Sexual or suggestive dialogue (not used with the TV-MA rating)
 L – Coarse or crude language
 S – Sexual situations
 V – Violence
 FV – Fantasy violence (exclusive to the TV-Y7 rating)

Up to four content descriptors can be applied alongside an assigned rating, depending on the kind of suggestive content featured in a program; the FV descriptor is an exception due to its sole use for the TV-Y7 rating, which can have no descriptor other than FV. As the rating increases pertaining to the age, the content matters generally get more intensive. These descriptors allow for 44 possible combinations for all the ratings total. The "suggestive dialogue" descriptor is used for TV-PG and TV-14 rated programs only, but rarely TV-MA. The violence descriptor was used for TV-Y7 programs from August 1997 until the creation of the 'FV' descriptor later that year.

Unofficially, broadcast television networks and syndicators have sparingly applied "E/I" (separately used as a specific identifier for children's programs) as an informal content descriptor for select TV-Y, TV-Y7, and TV-G programs that are designed to meet the educational and informative needs of children. A minimum of three hours of E/I-compliant programming must be broadcast per week by each television network, with exemptions and looser regulations applying to digital subchannels; all E/I programs must air between 6:00 a.m. and 10:00 p.m.

While the descriptors were specifically developed for the Parental Guidelines system, Apple TV (except for some subscription add-ons sold through its Apple TV Channels marketplace) applies the system's descriptors to theatrically released films rated under the Motion Picture Association's proprietary ratings system, in lieu of other content advisory descriptions (such as the more specific advisory system used by premium cable services, including those sold through the Apple TV platform); Hulu typically restricts on-screen ratings and content descriptors to its original programming and licensed films. On-screen ratings for original and licensed television series are featured on premium channel add-ons sold through Hulu to its VOD-only and VOD/live TV subscribers, though not on series licensed from its network and distribution partners.

Rather than use the default content descriptors, other streaming services like Disney+, HBO Max, Prime Video and Netflix (the latter basing ratings and content information for original and some licensed series on the program's overall maturity level, rather than on an episode-to-episode basis) may provide more concise detail of the thematic material in a particular title alongside the title’s rating.

Design 

For the first 15 seconds of every rated program lasting a half-hour or less, a large rating icon appears in the upper-left hand corner of the screen; previously this had a common design using a universal icon, but now often goes with a network's branding and design language or, for some streaming services like Netflix, HBO Max and Disney+, merely denotes the rating and details of mature material in a program in a straight line of text. The icon was much smaller until June 2005 and only appeared on-screen for 7.5 seconds. For every rated program running an hour or longer, a rating appears in the upper-left hand corner of the television screen at the beginning of each half-hour. Starting in June 2005, many networks now display the ratings after every commercial break, in addition to the beginning of the program. Ratings icons formerly appeared in the 4:3 safe area, even with a 16:9 HD-designed presentation, but have moved into the top-left corner of the 16:9 picture as time has gone on.

Viewer discretion advisories 

Some programs may voluntarily display a disclaimer regarding the show's objectionable content with the TV rating prior to the program starting, along with audibly repeating the same, with the reason for the rating (e.g. suggestive dialogue, drug and alcohol abuse, language, sexual situations, violence, nudity) and strongly cautioning parents to decide whether the program is suitable for their children. Several channels (including USA Network and AMC) insert special caution boards for horror programs at the end of commercial breaks, almost always occurring before a series uses the word "fuck" in uncensored dialogue.

Viewer discretion advisories are mostly used for programs rated TV-MA or series where most episodes are TV-14-rated with lighter content. They are also commonly used for television broadcasts of theatrical films; this, however, depends highly on the content and rating (alternatively, said content might also be edited out).

See also 
 Television content rating systems
 United States pay television content advisory system
 Motion Picture Association film rating system
 Canadian TV rating systems

References

External links 
 TV Parental Guidelines – Official site
  V-Chip at the FCC website

Entertainment rating organizations
Media content ratings systems
Mass media in the United States
Television in the United States
1997 establishments in the United States
Organizations established in 1997
1997 introductions
1997 in American television